Nikola Yonkov Vaptsarov (7 December 1909 – 23 July 1942) was a Bulgarian poet, communist and revolutionary. Working most of his life as a machinist, he only wrote in his spare time. Despite the fact that he only ever published one poetry book, he is considered one of the most important Bulgarian poets. Because of his underground communist activity against the government of Boris III and the German troops in Bulgaria, Vaptsarov was arrested, tried, sentenced and executed the same night by a firing squad.

Biography 
He was born in Bansko. Trained as a machine engineer at the Naval Machinery School in Varna, which was later named after him. His first service was on the famous Drazki torpedo boat. In April and May 1932, Vaptsarov visited Istanbul, Famagusta, Alexandria, Beirut, Port Said, and Haifa as a crew member of the Burgas vessel.

Later, he went to work in a factory in the village of Kocherinovo – at first as a stoker and eventually as a mechanic. He was elected Chairman of the Association, protecting worker rights in the factory. Vaptsarov was devoted to his talent and spent his free time writing and organizing amateur theater pieces. He got fired after a technical failure in 1936. This forced him to move to Sofia, where he worked for the state railway service and the municipal incinerating furnace. He continued writing, and a number of newspapers published poems of his. The "Romantika" poem won him a poetry contest.

Over time, Vaptsarov absorbed a lot of Communist ideas and started taking an active part in the ideological movement. In the late 1930s, he was part of the Macedonian literary circle (which had the task of creating a distinct Macedonian language), but Vaptsarov continued writing only in standard Bulgarian. In 1940, he participated in the so-called "Sobolev action," gathering signatures for a pact of friendship between Bulgaria and the USSR. The illegal activity earned him an arrest and an internment in the village of Godech. After his release in September 1940, Vaptsarov got involved with the Central Military Committee of the Bulgarian Communist Party. His task was to organize the supply of guns and documents for the communist resistance. He was arrested in March 1942. On 23 July 1942, he was sentenced to death and shot the same evening along with 11 other men.

Literary works
His only released book of poetry is Motor Songs (1940).

Legacy
In 1949, the Bulgarian Naval Academy was renamed Nikola Vaptsarov Naval Academy. On 3 December 1953, he received posthumously the International Peace Award. His Selected Poems were published in London in 1954, by Lawrence & Wishart, translated into English with a foreword by British poet Peter Tempest. His poetry has been translated in 98 languages throughout the world. Vaptsarov Peak in eastern Livingston Island, Antarctica is named after the famous Bulgarian poet.
Today, Nikola Vaptsarov's childhood home in Bansko and residence in Sofia are both museums.

Notes

External links 
Full list of works 
Biography of Nikola Vapcarov 
Poems by Nikola Vapcarov 
Nikola Vaptsarov Naval Academy
Police files on Nikola Vaptsarov 

1909 births
1942 deaths
People from Bansko
Bulgarian male poets
Bulgarian communists
Modern history of the Blagoevgrad Province
Executed Bulgarian people
People executed by Bulgaria by firing squad
Burials at Central Sofia Cemetery
Macedonian Bulgarians
Executed writers
20th-century executions by Bulgaria
20th-century Bulgarian poets
Bulgarian resistance members